Kronprinsessegade 8, also known as Revisorenes Hus (The Auditors House) after its current owner, FSR - Danish Auditors´Danish Auditors Association, is a listed, Neoclassical property overlooking Rosenborg Castle Garden in central Copenhagen, Denmark. The building was listed on the Danish register of protected buildings and places in 1845.

History

Early history
Kronprinsessegade 8 was built by Johan Martin Quist for Jeremias Henriques and Jacob Henriques in 1803-1804 .

The composer Christoph Ernst Friedrich Weyse lived in an apartment in the building from 1815. In September 1817, a 14-year-old Hans Christian Andersen came to the apartment to pick up the first portion of a monthly allowance. It was the result of a fund-raising that Weyse had initiated at a dinner party held by Giuseppe Siboni the previous evening. Weyse moved to a new apartment in the building at No. 36. He was very fond of the street and it has been said about him the "he never ventured out of Kronprinsessegade and the  time".

The later politician Christian Albrecht Bluhme, then a defence judge advocate (auditør) in the Second Jutland Infantry Regiment, was a resident in the building in 1821. Frederik Bülow, then a lieutenant in the Royal Danish Army, lived in the building in 1821–22.

Jost van Docum, a counter admiral, resided on the ground floor at the 1834 census. He lived there  with his wife Jost van Documm tehir three sons (aged 	24 to 32(one male servant and two maids.

1845 census
 
The property was home to 27 residents in five households at the time of the 1845 census. Isaac H.Ruben, a textile printer, resided on the ground floor with his wife Susanne Blachm their four children (aged 11 to 22) and two maids. He operated a textile printing business in the building before constructing a large new textile factory at Rolighedsvej in Frederiksberg in 1857. Elisabeth Ida Margrethe Cederfeld de Simonsen (1792-1883), widow of Hans Wilhelm Cederfeld de Simonsen (1777-1836), resided on the first floor with two of her children (aged 26 and 27). Lars Svane (1790-1874), a goods broker, resided on the second floor with his wife Julie Clausen	(1796-1887), two of their sons and one maid. The eldest of the sons was the later bishop of Viborg Jørgen Svane (1821-1903). Carl Eduard Moldenhawer, inspector at the Royal Danish Library, resided on the third flor with his wife Marie Elise Brockhausen, their three children (aged three to 15), an maid and the painter Carl Andreas Isling.

Later history
Bloch & Andresen, Nordisk Tekstil, a textile company, was based in the building in 1950.

Danske Revisorer bought the building in circa the 1970s. In 2023, Danske Tevisorer sold the building to Cope Ejendomme.

Architecture
 
The building consists of four storeys over a cellar and is six bays wide. The facade features a frieze between the first and second floor. A gateway in the right side of the building opens to a courtyard. A six-bay side wing projects from the rear side of the building and connects to a six bay rear wing at the bottom of the courtyard.

Today
FSR - Danish Auditors is based in the building. Varmings Tegnestue has refurbished the building. The warehouse in the courtyard was adapted for use as canteen.

Gallery

References

External links

 FSR - Danish Auditors
 [https://cvrapi.dk/virksomhed/dk/ejdmatrnr386-kronprinsessegade-8foreningen-statsautrevisorer/60022658 E(F Kronpribnsessegade 8[
 Nordisk Tekstil

Apartment buildings in Copenhagen
Listed residential buildings in Copenhagen
Residential buildings completed in 1897
1797 establishments in Denmark